The fourth season of MTV's reality dating series Are You the One? premiered on June 13, 2016.

Cast

Progress 

Notes

 Unconfirmed Perfect Match

Due to the blackout in Episode 8, the whole cast lost $250,000, lowering the total money at the end to $750,000, instead of $1,000,000.

Truth Booths

Episodes

After filming 
Asaf Goren & Kaylen Zahara, Cameron Kolbo & Mikala Thomas, Giovanni Rivera & Francesca Duncan and Morgan St. Pierre & Tori Deal returned for Are You The One?: Second Chances.

In addition to his appearances on MTV programs, Asaf Goren has also competed on So You Think You Can Dance 12, Worst Cooks in America 12 and Celebrity Big Brother Israel 3. He also appeared on RuPaul's Drag Race as a member of the Pit Crew.

Cameron Kolbo appeared on the first season of Ex on the Beach.

The Challenge 

{|class="wikitable" style="text-align: center"
!Cast Member
!The Challenges
!Challenges Won
!Total Money Earned
|-
|Asaf Goren
|Total Madness
|None
|$0
|-
|rowspan=2|Tori Deal
|XXX: Dirty 30, Final Reckoning, War of the Worlds 2,Total Madness, Double Agents, Spies, Lies & Allies, Ride or Dies
|Ride or Dies
|$454,000
|-
|Champs vs. Stars 2, Champs vs. Stars 3, World Championship
|None
|$950
|}
Challenge in bold indicates that the contestant was a finalist on The Challenge.

Note: Tori made an appearance on Vendettas'' for an elimination.

References

Are You the One?
2016 American television episodes